Paul Ssemogerere (born 30 June 1956) is a Roman Catholic prelate who serves as the Archbishop of the Roman Catholic Archdiocese of Kampala. He was appointed to this position by Pope Francis on 9 December 2021. He was installed as Archbishiop of Kampala on 25 January 2022, at Saint Mary's Cathedral Rubaga, in Kampala.

Previously, he was the Bishop of the Roman Catholic Diocese of Kasana-Luweero, in Uganda. He was appointed bishop of Kasana-Luweero on 4 June 2008.

Early life and education
Ssemogerere was born on 30 June 1956 at Kisubi, in present-day Wakiso District in the Buganda Region of Uganda. This location is in the Roman Catholic Archdiocese of Kampala.

He attended Kigero Primary School before transferring to Kisubi Boys Primary School. He then studied at St. Maria Goretti Senior Secondary School Katende, where he completed his O-Level studies. In 1976, Ssemogerere and seven other young men became pioneer students at St Mbaaga Seminary at Ggaba. This was the first class of this seminary, which specializes in admitting men to train as priests when they are older than usual, and without attending minor seminary.

In 1978, the late Cardinal Emmanuel Kiwanuka Nsubuga sent Ssemogerere to the Saint Francis de Sales Seminary, in Milwaukee, Wisconsin, in the United States, where he graduated with a Master of Divinity degree in 1982. On 21 November 1981, he was ordained a deacon by Archbishop Rembert George Weakland, the Archbishop of the Roman Catholic Archdiocese of Milwaukee.

Priesthood
He was ordained a priest on 3 June 1983 at Kampala, by Cardinal Emmanuel Nsubuga, Archbishop of Kampala. He served as a priest in the Roman Catholic Archdiocese of Kampala, until 4 June 2008.

As bishop
He was appointed bishop of the Roman Catholic Diocese of Kasana-Luweero, on 4 June 2008. He was consecrated as bishop on 23 August 2008 at Kasana-Luweero by Archbishop Cyprian Kizito Lwanga, Archbishop of Kampala, assisted by Cardinal Emmanuel Wamala, Cardinal-Priest of Sant'Ugo, and Cardinal Emeritus of Kampala and Archbishop Paul Tschang In-Nam, Titular Archbishop of Amantia and Papal Nuncio to Uganda at that time. On Thursday 8 April 2021, he was appointed Apostolic Administrator of Kampala archdiocese by Pope Francis after the sudden death of Dr. Cyprian Kizito Lwanga who was the Archbishop of Kampala. Ssemogerere was elevated  to Archbishop of Kampala Archdiocese by Pope Francis on Thursday 9 December 2021.

As Archbishop
He was appointed archbishop of Kampala Archdiocese on 9 December 2021 and was installed on 25 January 2022, as Archbishop of Kampala, Uganda by the Apostolic Nucio.

See also
 Uganda Martyrs
 Roman Catholicism in Uganda

Succession table

References

External links
Ssemogerere's Incredible Walk To Kasana-Luweero As of 4 September 2020.

1956 births
Living people
Ugandan Roman Catholics
21st-century Roman Catholic bishops in Uganda
People from Wakiso District
St. Francis Seminary (Wisconsin) alumni
Roman Catholic bishops of Kasana–Luweero